Penzance Promenade is an electoral division of Cornwall in the United Kingdom and returns one member to sit on Cornwall Council. The current Councillor is Jim McKenna, an Independent.

Councillors

2009-2021

2021-present

Extent

2009-2021
Under its former boundaries, Penzance Promenade represented the south west of Penzance including Alverton, Wherrytown and a small part of Newlyn (most of which was covered by the Newlyn and Mousehole division). The ward was nominally abolished and reformed by redistricting at the 2013 election, but this had little effect on the division. Before boundary changes, it covered 140.26 hectares in total; after, it covered 140.63 hectares.

2021-present
With its current boundaries, the division covers the south of the town of Penzance including Alverton, Wherrytown, Morrab Gardens and Battery Rocks.

Election results

2021 election

2017 election

2013 election

2009 election

References

Electoral divisions of Cornwall Council
Penzance